Diane Morgan (born 5 October 1975) is an English actress, comedian, television presenter, and writer. She is best known for playing Philomena Cunk on Charlie Brooker's Weekly Wipe and in other mockumentaries, as Liz in the BBC Two sitcom Motherland, and Kath in the Netflix dark comedy series After Life. She also wrote and starred in the BBC Two comedy series Mandy.

Early life
Morgan was born in Bolton, Greater Manchester, on 5 October 1975, daughter of a physiotherapist and a stay-at-home mother; she has one brother. She grew up in nearby Farnworth and Kearsley, and attended George Tomlinson School in Kearsley. When she was 20, she studied at the East 15 Acting School in Loughton. She said in a 2020 interview, "There were a few actors on [my father]'s side of the family: Julie Goodyear, Frank Finlay and Jack Wild. What a dynasty. We're like the Redgraves. Julie's got a touch of the Mandys, actually. Maybe I could cast her as Mandy's mum."

Career
Morgan had a small part as Dawn in Peter Kay's Phoenix Nights before a spell working various jobs, including as a dental assistant, a telemarketer, a potato peeler at a chip shop, selling Avon, and boxing up worming tablets in a factory. She subsequently made her first attempt at stand-up comedy. She was placed second in the Hackney Empire New Act of the Year award in 2006 and as runner-up in the 2006 Funny Women Awards.

Morgan and Joe Wilkinson later formed a sketch comedy duo called Two Episodes of Mash. From 2008, they performed at the Edinburgh Festival Fringe for three consecutive years, and in 2010, they appeared on Robert Webb's satirical news show Robert's Web. In 2012 the act completed its second BBC radio series (co-starring David O'Doherty), and appeared in BBC Three's Live at the Electric.

In 2012, she appeared in Him & Her, which features Wilkinson, and in 2013, she played Nicola in the TV series Pat & Cabbage. In 2014, she made an appearance in the TV series Utopia, as Tess, and in 2015, she appeared in two episodes of Drunk History.

Philomena Cunk
Morgan is perhaps best known for her portrayal of Philomena Cunk, an extremely dim-witted and ill-informed interviewer and commentator on current affairs. The character first appeared in a regular segment on Charlie Brooker's Weekly Wipe (2013–2015). Cunk has since appeared in other mockumentary contexts. In December 2016, she presented BBC Two's Cunk on Christmas. In April 2018, the five-part historical mockumentary Cunk on Britain began broadcasting on BBC Two. Also in 2018, Morgan wrote Cunk on Everything: The Encyclopedia Philomena, published by Two Roads on 1 November. In December 2019, Morgan appeared as Cunk for short episodes of Cunk and Other Humans, once again on BBC Two. She returned in a one-off episode of Charlie Brooker's Weekly Wipe titled "Antiviral Wipe", about the COVID-19 pandemic, in May 2020. Another series, Cunk on Earth, began broadcasting in September 2022.

Other roles
Morgan played David Brent's public relations guru in the film David Brent: Life on the Road (2016). She has appeared in several short films, including The Boot Sale, which was shortlisted in the Virgin Media Shorts film competition 2010.

In 2016, Morgan played Mandy in Sky One's comedy Rovers, appearing in all six episodes of the first series. She also appeared in the pilot for the BBC2 comedy We the Jury as Olivia. She also plays receptionist Talia in Sky's comedy drama Mount Pleasant and Liz in the BBC2 sitcom Motherland.

Morgan plays Kath in the Netflix black-comedy series After Life, written by Ricky Gervais. She starred in the Gold sitcom The Cockfields, again alongside Wilkinson, and in comedy-drama Frayed in 2019. In 2019, she wrote, directed, and starred in the BBC2 comedy short Mandy, described as "a comedy by Diane Morgan about Mandy, a woman who really, really wants a sofa, and will stop at absolutely nothing to get it". Carol Decker appeared as herself in the short. It returned in August 2020 for the full series Mandy, with Shaun Ryder, Maxine Peake, and Natalie Cassidy in guest roles. A Christmas special, We Wish You a Mandy Christmas, loosely based on A Christmas Carol, was broadcast in December 2021.

Also in 2020, Morgan played Gemma Nerrick in the British mockumentary Death to 2020, created by Charlie Brooker and Annabel Jones. She reprised the role in Death to 2021. She voiced the character 105E in the 2021 animated Cartoon Network series Elliott from Earth.

In April 2022, Morgan starred as Donna in the first episode of the seventh series of Inside No. 9. In December 2022, Morgan reprised her role as Liz on Motherland for the Christmas special.

Personal life
Morgan lives in the Bloomsbury district of London with her boyfriend, BBC comedy producer Ben Caudell.

Filmography

References

External links
 Profile on agent's website
 
 

1975 births
Living people
21st-century English actresses
21st-century English comedians
Actresses from Greater Manchester
Alumni of East 15 Acting School
Comedians from Greater Manchester
English film actresses
English television actresses
English women comedians
Actors from Bolton